In Vajrayana Buddhism, the Diamond Realm (Skt. वज्रधातु vajradhātu, Traditional Chinese: 金剛界; Pinyin: Jīngāngjiè; Romaji: Kongōkai) is a metaphysical space inhabited by the Five Tathagatas.  The Diamond Realm Mandala is based on an esoteric Buddhist sutra called the Vajrasekhara Sutra.

The Diamond Realm is a very popular subject for mandalas, and along with the Womb Realm (garbhakoṣadhātu) Mandala forms the Mandala of the Two Realms.  This mandala, along with the Womb Realm, form the core of Chinese Tangmi and Japanese Shingon rituals, including the initiation or abhiṣeka ritual. In this ritual, new initiates are blindfolded, and are asked to toss a flower upon a mandala. Where the flower lands helps decide which Buddhist figure the student should devote themselves to.

In traditional Tangmi and Shingon halls, the Diamond Realm Mandala is hung on the west wall symbolizing the final realization of Mahāvairocana Buddha. In this setting, the Womb Realm Mandala is hung on the east wall, symbolizing the young stage of Mahāvairocana Buddha.

In Chinese Buddhism, the Diamond Realm Mandala is also associated with the Yogacara Flaming Mouth Ritual (瑜伽焰口法會), which is often conducted during the Chinese Ghost Festival in order to feed pretas and reduce their suffering. Part of the ritual involves the performing ritual master wearing a Vairocana crown which is adorned with images of the Five Tathāgatas. The textual tradition for this part of the ritual asserts that the thirty-seven deities which make up the Diamond Realm Mandala are installed in the crown and that these deities confer their blessings and powers on the ritual master during the performance of the ritual.

See also 
Dhatu - Vajradhatu - Womb Realm - Dharmadhatu

References

Further reading 
  Grotenhuis, Elizabeth Ten (1999). Japanese mandalas: representations of sacred geography, Honolulu: University of Hawai'i Press, pp. 33-57

External links 
The Diamond and Womb World Mandalas Dharmapala Thangka Centre
Mandala of the Womb World - Dharmapala Thangka Centre

Buddhist philosophical concepts